Indian Stream is a tributary of the Connecticut River, approximately  long, in New Hampshire in the United States. It rises in the mountains of extreme northern New Hampshire, in Coos County near the Canada–United States border, where the East Branch of Indian Stream joins the West Branch.

The area around Pittsburg was the subject of a border dispute in the 1830s between the United States and Canada, leading to the short-lived, self-proclaimed Republic of Indian Stream. The border dispute, based upon an ambiguity in the Treaty of Paris (1783), was resolved in 1842, with the river drainage and the land lying east of Halls Stream established as part of the state of New Hampshire.

See also 

 List of New Hampshire rivers

References

Rivers of New Hampshire
Pittsburg, New Hampshire
Rivers of Coös County, New Hampshire
Tributaries of the Connecticut River